Evelyn Maurine Norton Lincoln (June 25, 1909 – May 11, 1995) was the personal secretary to John F. Kennedy from his election to the United States Senate in 1953 until his 1963 assassination. Lincoln, who was in the motorcade when Kennedy was assassinated, visited Kennedy's grave every year on the anniversary of his death.

Life 
Lincoln was born Evelyn Maurine Norton on a farm in Polk County, Nebraska. Her father was John N. Norton, a member of the United States House of Representatives. In 1930, she married Federal worker Harold W. Lincoln, whom she had met as a law student at George Washington University.

Lincoln had always aimed to work on Capitol Hill for a future president, and she achieved this ambition in 1953 by becoming personal secretary to the newly-elected senator from Massachusetts, John F. Kennedy. She proved suitable for the job, and remained close to the president until his death. When Kennedy was assassinated in Dallas, Texas on November 22, 1963, Lincoln rode in the motorcade a few cars behind Kennedy with his personal physician, George G. Burkley. She made it a point to visit Kennedy's grave at Arlington National Cemetery every year afterward on the anniversary of his death.

Lincoln was reportedly upset that President Lyndon B. Johnson had given her 30 minutes to clear her office for his staff the morning following the assassination. In 1968, she wrote a book, Kennedy and Johnson, in which she wrote that President Kennedy had told her that Johnson would be replaced as Vice President of the United States. Lincoln wrote of that November 19, 1963 conversation, just before the assassination of President Kennedy,

 Lincoln went on to write "I was fascinated by this conversation and wrote it down verbatim in my diary. Now I asked, 'Who is your choice as a running-mate?' 'He looked straight ahead, and without hesitating he replied, 'at this time I am thinking about Governor Terry Sanford of North Carolina. But it will not be Lyndon.'"

In October 1994, Lincoln replied to a high school teacher's inquiry regarding her thoughts about the assassination stating that she believed Johnson – along with FBI director J. Edgar Hoover, the Central Intelligence Agency, the mafia, and "Cubans in Florida" – was involved in a conspiracy to assassinate Kennedy.

According to the National Archives, Lincoln gave away or sold many of Kennedy's documents and artifacts that she had been entrusted with managing by the Kennedy family after Kennedy's assassination. In 2005, a legal settlement was reached that enabled the National Archives, the Kennedy Library, and Caroline Kennedy to recover thousands of pages of documents and other items.
Lincoln died at Georgetown University Hospital in 1995, after complications that followed surgery for cancer. Her ashes were placed in a niche at a columbarium in Arlington National Cemetery.

Books 
Lincoln was the author of two books:
 My 12 Years With John F. Kennedy
 Kennedy and Johnson, 1968

References

Sources
Dallek, Robert Lyndon B. Johnson: Portrait of a President, p. 142. Oxford University Press, 2003.
Roth, James M. Reclaiming Pieces of Camelot: How NARA and the JFK Library Recovered Missing Kennedy Documents and Artifacts, Prologue Magazine, Summer 2006, Vol. 38, No. 2.

1909 births
1995 deaths
20th-century American people
20th-century American women
Burials at Arlington National Cemetery
Kennedy administration personnel
People from Chevy Chase, Maryland
People from Polk County, Nebraska
Personal secretaries to the President of the United States